Peter Du Cane may refer to:
 Peter Du Cane, the elder (1645–1714), Huguenot businessman in London
 Peter Du Cane Sr. (1713–1803), British merchant and businessman
 Peter Du Cane (boat designer) (1901–1984), British boat designer

See also
Peter Cain (disambiguation)
Peter Kane (disambiguation)